Galbanino is a soft, mild, cheese produced by the Italian company Galbani. It most closely resembles a mild provolone cheese.

See also
 List of stretch-cured cheeses

References

Italian cheeses
Stretched-curd cheeses